This is a list of notable people with a Wikipedia page associated with York, a city in North Yorkshire, England.

Actors and performers

Mark Addy (born 1964)
Taj Atwal (born 1987)
Rob Auton (living)
David Bradley (born 1942)
Michael Burns (born 1952)
Judi Dench (born 1934)
Keith Drinkel (born 1944)
Dustin Gee (1942–1986)
Frankie Howerd (1917–1992)
Ian Kelsey (born 1966)
Janet McTeer (born 1961)
Eille Norwood (1861–1948)
Peter Woodthorpe (1931–2004)

Arts 

Mary Ellen Best (1809–1891), painter
Nathan Drake (1728–1778), artist, a fellow of the Society of Artists
William Etty (1787–1849), painter.
John Flaxman (1755–1826), sculptor and draughtsman.
Patrick Hall (1906–1992), artist
Albert Joseph Moore (1841–1893), painter.
Francis Place (1647–1728), artist
Henry Scott Tuke (1858–1929), painter

Confectioners

Benjamin Seebohm Rowntree (1871–1954), chocolatier and reformer
Joseph Rowntree (1836–1925), chocolatier and philanthropist
Joseph Terry (1828–1898), confectioner

Musicians

Joseph Barnby (1838–1896) composer and conductor.
John Barry (1933–2011)
Findlay Brown (born 1975)
Syd Dale (1924–1994)
Iestyn Davies (born 1979)
Troy Donockley (born 1964)
Helen Grime (born 1981)
Beaumont Hannant (born 1970)
Låpsley (born 1996)
Benjamin Francis Leftwich (born 1989)
Rusko (born 1985)
The Thrillseekers (born 1973)
Trevor Watts (born 1939)
Trevor Wishart (born 1946)

Groups
Asking Alexandria
The Batfish Boys
Glamour of the Kill
Elliot Minor
Mostly Autumn
The Redskins
Rick Witter & The Dukes
RSJ
The Seahorses
Shed Seven
The Smoke
St. Christopher
With One Last Breath

Historians

Francis Drake (1696–1771), historian of York, Eboracum 1736
William Arthur Evelyn (1860–1935), historian
Sir Thomas Herbert, 1st Baronet (1606–1682), traveller, historian and writer.
John Edward Christopher Hill (1912–2003), Marxist historian
William Hepworth Thompson (1810–1886), classical scholar.

Politicians and rulers

John Aislabie (1670–1742), politician. 
Vincent Cable (born 1943)
Nicholas Clarevaux (late 13th c.)
Constantine the Great (AD 272–337), Roman Emperor acclaimed in Eboracum (York)
David Davis (born 1948)
Frank Dobson (1940–2019)
Richard Hotham (1722–1799)
George Hudson (1800–1871) railway financier and politician. 
Septimius Severus (193–211 in York), Roman Emperor.

Religion

Aaron of York (c. 1190 – c. 1253), financier and Chief Rabbi of England
Alcuin (c. 735–804), Christian scholar.
John Ball (c. 1338–1381), Lollard priest and rebel.
Margaret Clitherow (died 1586), Catholic saint and martyr
John Earle (c.1601–1665), bishop and writer on social customs.
Guy Fawkes (1570–1606), Roman Catholic revolutionary.
Josce of York (died 1190), Jewish martyr
Francis Mason (1799–1874), American missionary.
Thomas Morton (1564–1659), bishop.
Matthew Poole (1624–1679), theologian.
Beilby Porteus (1731–1809), successively Bishop of Chester and of London.
Richard Sterne (c. 1596–1683), Archbishop of York (1664–83), revised the 1662 Book of Common Prayer.
William of York (1110–1154), archbishop, patron saint of York

Sciences and architecture

Jocelyn Bell (born 1943), radio astronomer and discoverer of pulsars
William Etty (c. 1675–1734), architect
John Goodricke (1764–86), astronomer
Joseph Hansom (1803–1882), architect and inventor.
Peter Harrison (1716–1775), architect
George Hennet (1799–1857), railway contractor and entrepreneur
Ivar the Boneless (794–872), Viking chieftain.
Christopher Hill (1912–2003), historian of 17th-century England and Master of Balliol College, Oxford
John Middleton (1820–1885), architect
William Parsons, 3rd Earl of Rosse (1800–1867), astronomer.
Martin Rees (born 1942), Lord Rees of Ludlow, current Astronomer Royal
George Russell (1857–1951), horticulturalist who developed Russell hybrid lupins
John Snow (1813–1858), physician

Sports

Football

Pawel Abbott (born 1982)
Tom Allan (born 1994)
Reg Baines (1907–1974)
Ron Benson (1925–1997)
Albert Bonass (1911–1945)
Sam Byram (born 1993)
Cliff Calvert (born 1954)
Walter Camidge (1912–1987)
Jack Clarke (born 2000)
Lewis Cook (born 1997)
Nick Culkin (born 1978)
Andy Dawson (born 1979)
Richard Dawson (born 1962)
Michael Duckworth (born 1992)
Iain Dunn (born 1970)
Bernard Fisher (born 1934)
Gary Ford (born 1961)
Martin Fowler (born 1957)
Martin Garratt (1980–2014)
Ben Godfrey (born 1998)
Neil Grayson (born 1964)
Ross Greenwood (born 1985)
John Hawksby (born 1942)
Nick Hendry (1887–1949)
Simon Heslop (born 1987)
Jamie Hopcutt (born 1992)
Russell Howarth (born 1982)
Will Jarvis (born 2002)
Mike Johnson (1933–2004)
Matthew Kilgallon (born 1984)
George Lee (1919–1991)
Steve McClaren (born 1961), also manager
Max McMillan (born 2002)
George Maskill (1906–1969)
Tommy Maskill (1903–1956)
Cliff Mason (1929–2013)
Alexander Mein (1854–1927)
Albert Meysey-Thompson (1848–1894)
Charles Meysey-Thompson (1849–1881)
Andrew Milne (born 1990)
Les Milner (1917–1944)
Bobby Mimms (born 1963)
Cammy Palmer (born 2000)
Alf Patrick (1921–2021)
Shaun Pearson (born 1989)
Jack Pinder (1912–2004)
Brian Pollard (born 1954)
Peter Popely (born 1943)
John Powell (1936–2017)
Harvey Rodgers (born 1996)
George Sharpe (1912–1984)
Reg Stockill (1913–1995)
Gary Swann (born 1962)
Barry Tait (born 1938)
Chris Tate (born 1977)
Charlie Taylor (born 1993)
Marc Thompson (born 1982)
Steve Tutill (born 1969)
Rory Watson (born 1996)
Eric Weightman (1910–2002)
Michael Woods (born 1990)
Neil Woods (born 1966)
and 
Lucy Staniforth (born 1992)

Rugby
Peter Fox, (born 1984) Wakefield Trinity
Rob Webber, (born 1986) Bath Rugby

Cricket

David Alleyne (born 1976)
Henry Badger (1900–1975)
Tom Bartram (born 1986)
Scott Boswell (born 1974)
Philip Bower (1898–1978)
Andrew Brewster (born 1977)
Stephen Coverdale (born 1964)
Leonard Day (1859–1943)
Harry Dewse (1836–1910)
Matthew Fisher (born 1997)
Paul Gibb (1913–1977)
Charles Hall (1906–1976)
John Hicks (1850–1912)
Tom Loten (born 1999)
John Nuttall (born 1967)
Manfred Palmes (1887–1968)
Charles Prest (1841–1875)
William Prest (1832–1885)
Thomas Pride (1864–1919)
Joseph Sullivan (1890–1932)
Steven Taylor (born 1963)
Nick Thornicroft (born 1985)
Lauren Winfield (born 1990)
Tim Walton (born 1972)

Motor sport
Steve Webster MBE (born 1960)

Basketball
Isaac Fotu (born 1993)

Writers

Kate Atkinson (born 1951), novelist and playwright
W. H. Auden (1907–1973), poet and essayist
Nathan Drake (1766–1836), essayist and physician.
Matt Haig (born 1975), novelist and journalist
Justin Hill (born 1971), novelist
Alison Hume (living), television writer
Sheelagh Kelly (born 1948), novelist
Andrew Martin (born 1962), novelist and journalist
Fiona Mozley (born 1988), novelist
Laurence Sterne (1713–1768), author of The Life and Opinions of Tristram Shandy, Gentleman.
J. E. Harold Terry (1885–1939), novelist, playwright and critic
Silvanus P. Thompson (1851–1916), author and electrical engineer
Charles Whiting (1926–2007), novelist and military historian

Others

Benedict of York (died 1189), money lender
Jon Champion (born 1965), broadcaster
William B. Franklin (1823–1903) a career US Army officer.
Captain Christopher Levett (1586–1630), explorer of New England, first settler of York (present-day Portland), Maine
Elizabeth Montagu (1718–1800) social reformer and patron of the arts.
Guy Mowbray (born 1972), football commentator
Laura Sayers (born 1978), radio producer and diarist
Siward, Earl of Northumbria (died 1055), army commander.
James Hack Tuke (1819–1896), social campaigner.
Daniel Hack Tuke (1827–1895), social campaigner.
Henry Tuke (1755–1814), social campaigner.
Samuel Tuke (1784–1857), social campaigner.
William Tuke (1732–1822), social campaigner.

See also
List of alumni of the University of York

References

 
York
People from York